Air One S.p.A. was an Italian low-cost airline which operated as Air One "Smart Carrier". It operated as Alitalia's low-cost carrier subsidiary with operating bases located in Catania–Fontanarossa Airport, Palermo Falcone–Borsellino Airport, Pisa International Airport, Venice Marco Polo Airport and Verona Villafranca Airport; while Tirana was a focus city. "Air One" is a portmanteau of the English meaning Air One and the Italian word 'airone', pronounced IPA [ai'rone],  meaning heron (the bird depicted in the airline's logo), which was also the airline's callsign.

Before the merger with Alitalia, Air One was a competitor, the second largest airline in Italy, with a network to 36 destinations in Italy, Europe and North America. Its main bases were Leonardo da Vinci-Fiumicino Airport in Rome, Linate Airport in Milan and Turin Airport.

Air One ceased operations on 30 October 2014 as part of the new concept of its parent company Alitalia based on its new partnership with Etihad Airways. All routes were either cancelled or taken over by Alitalia itself.

History

First years
On 27 April 1995 Aliadriatica began scheduled flights between Milan (Linate) and Brindisi and Reggio Calabria and Lamezia Terme.

In the year 2000 Air One announced a partnership with Lufthansa and nearly all Air One flights became code-shared with Lufthansa.

As from June 2006, regional destinations were served under the name Air One CityLiner with the brand new fleet of Bombardier CRJ-900s.

In 2007, Air One carried approximately 5.5 million passengers (scheduled and charter), thus becoming the second largest Italian airline in terms of passenger traffic. 2007 revenues totaled EUR750 million with a net profit of EUR6.8 million.

Merger with Alitalia

In August 2008, it was announced that Air One was to be merged with Alitalia. Air One was almost bankrupt in 2008, and the merger with Alitalia-CAI was the only viable solution to save it.

On 13 January 2009, Air One officially became part of Alitalia, though the two airlines were to be combined into one over time.  A detailed integration plan was at that time yet to be announced.

On 28 March 2009, due to the merger with Alitalia, the cooperation between Lufthansa's Miles & More and Air One ended. On 28 June 2009, also due to the Alitalia merger, the partnerships with United Airlines' Mileage Plus program and Air Canada's Aeroplan program ended.

Later in 2009, the Alitalia and Air One booking procedures were unified so that the airlines effectively became the same.

Air One "Smart Carrier" - low cost subsidiary

On 28 March 2010, Air One Smart Carrier as a separate brand from Alitalia began operating low-cost flights out of Milan Malpensa Airport. Nine domestic and five international destinations were initially served, using five Airbus A320s painted in the Air One livery and formatted to 180 seats.

In its first full quarter of operations, Air One Smart Carrier transported 320 000 passengers, with an on-time performance of 89%.

On 2 February 2011, Air One Smart Carrier announced that, in the summer 2011 season, it would expand its operations at Milan Malpensa and also open a new base at Pisa Airport. The base opened on 1 July 2011. Air One Smart Carrier predicted it would carry 1,6 million passengers in 2011, compared to 0,9 million in 2010, and a new website was also launched.

On 21 December 2011, Air One Smart Carrier announced a new base at Venice Marco Polo Airport, with flights starting in May 2012. On 1 October 2012, operations commenced at Air One Smart Carrier's new base in Catania Fontanarossa Airport, the fourth base.  In September 2013 the opening of a fifth base at Palermo Falcone-Borsellino Airport was announced with flights to commence in March 2014 including a new route to London Gatwick Airport, a destination not served by Air One since the ending of flights from Milan Malpensa Airport.

On 26 October 2013, Air One closed its operating base in Milan Malpensa Airport and announced a new base at Palermo Falcone–Borsellino Airport. The flights from Palermo started in March 2014.

Closure
On 26 August 2014, it was announced that parent-company Alitalia would shut down Air One by autumn 2014. All remaining routes were terminated by 30 October 2014 with some base operations and routes already closed by 30 September. Some routes, especially within Italy, have been taken over by Alitalia itself as well as the former Air One fleet.

Destinations

Fleet history 
Air One operated the following aircraft types during its history:

The Air One fleet progression over the years:

In January 2006, the airline signed a contract with Airbus for 30 Airbus A320s and 60 options, to replace the carrier's leased fleet of Boeing 737-400s.
In May 2007, the airline announced the conversion of options and purchase rights for 50 Airbus A320s into firm orders, bringing its commitment to the type to 90 aircraft.
In June 2008, the airline ordered 24 aircraft from Airbus for 4.8 billion dollars. Air One also had an option to buy another 20 aircraft for 3.8 billion dollars. The order included 12 Airbus A330s and 12 A350s. The order was transferred to Alitalia when Air One ceased operations.

See also
 List of defunct airlines of Italy

References

External links

Official website
Official website of Air One Executive

Defunct airlines of Italy
Airlines established in 1983
Airlines disestablished in 2014
Alitalia
Italian companies established in 1983
Italian companies disestablished in 2014